Mühlehorn is a former municipality in the canton of Glarus in Switzerland. Effective from 1 January 2011, Mühlehorn is part of the municipality of Glarus Nord.

History
Mühlehorn is first mentioned in 1551 as Mülihorn.

Geography

Of this area, 33.8% is used for agricultural purposes, while 52.4% is forested. Of the rest of the land, 3.9% is settled (buildings or roads) and the remainder (9.9%) is non-productive (rivers, glaciers or mountains).

Mühlehorn is located on the southern shore of the Walensee.  It consists of the village of Mühlehorn and the hamlets of Vortobel, Tiefenwinkel and Mühletal which are on the north-east border of the canton.

Demographics
Mühlehorn had a population (as of 2010) of 416.  , 13.4% of the population was made up of foreign nationals.  Over the last 10 years the population has decreased at a rate of -13.2%.  Most of the population speaks German  (88.9%), with Serbo-Croatian being second most common ( 7.9%) and Italian being third ( 1.1%).

In the 2007 federal election the most popular party was the SPS which received 54% of the vote.  Most of the rest of the votes went to the SVP with 31% of the vote.

In Mühlehorn about 67.3% of the population (between age 25-64) have completed either non-mandatory upper secondary education or additional higher education (either University or a Fachhochschule).

Mühlehorn has an unemployment rate of 0.71%.  , there were 17 people employed in the primary economic sector and about 7 businesses involved in this sector.  88 people are employed in the secondary sector and there are 9 businesses in this sector.  38 people are employed in the tertiary sector, with 13 businesses in this sector.

The historical population is given in the following table:

Transportation
The municipality is located on the A3 motorway.

References

Former municipalities of the canton of Glarus
Populated places on the Walensee